The Melbourne Cricket Club (MCC) is a sports club based in Melbourne, Australia. It was founded in 1838 and is one of the oldest sports clubs in Australia.

The MCC is responsible for management and development of the Melbourne Cricket Ground, a power given to it by the government-appointed MCG Trust and an Act of Parliament. This also guarantees the club's occupation of about 20 per cent of the stadium for its members reserve.

In 1859, members drafted the first set of rules for Australian rules football. In 1877, it hosted the first game of Test cricket in history—played between Australia and England. In 1971, the ground hosted the first One Day International cricket match.

As well as cricket, the MCC is also an umbrella organisation for other sports, such as Australian rules football, baseball (through the Melbourne Baseball Club), bowls, croquet, field hockey, golf, lacrosse, netball, target shooting, squash, real tennis and tennis.

Since 2009 the Melbourne Football Club has been the football division of the club having previously been part of the club from 1889 to 1980.

History
On 15 November 1838, the first MCC cricket match occurred at the site of the Royal Mint.
At the same time five men met and formed the Melbourne Cricket Club; they were Frederick Powlett, Robert Russell, George B. Smyth and brothers Alfred and Charles Mundy. Three of the five, Powlett, Smyth and Alfred Mundy were neighbouring pastoralists at Kilmore. In 1839 the MCC began playing cricket matches near the current site of Southern Cross railway station. Powlett was elected inaugural President in 1841.

Membership

The Melbourne Cricket Club is the largest sporting club in Australia. As of August 2015 there were 104,000 members of the club, of which 62,700 were "full members" and 41,300 were "restricted members", with 242,000 people registered on the waiting list. That same year, a new category below Restricted Membership was created called Provisional Membership, which "is designed to prevent the already lengthy wait for membership of our club from extending to 40 years or more in generations to come." Provisional members "have fewer benefits and less access to the Reserve than Full and Restricted members." As of 31 January 2018, the waiting list "consist[s] of candidates nominated from 1 October 2000 to today."

Full membership entitles members to entry to the Members' Reserve at the MCG for all cricket and football matches and most special sporting events. Full members also have a number of added benefits, which include reciprocal rights at clubs and stadiums around Australia and overseas as well as the opportunity to attend numerous club functions exclusive to MCC members.  Restricted members also have access to events, with the exception of the AFL Grand Final. Full members, but not restricted members, are also permitted to nominate candidates for the waiting list and to vote on club affairs.

Reciprocal clubs
Members of the MCC are able to access the members' area of reciprocal clubs, typically while on a short visit to the area. These benefits, with the exclusion of the VRC and Docklands Stadium, are reserved for full members. These clubs include:

 Docklands Stadium Axcess One, Melbourne
 Victoria Racing Club (VRC), Melbourne
 Sydney Cricket Ground, Sydney
 Brisbane Cricket Ground Trust (Gabba), Brisbane
 South Australian Cricket Association (Adelaide Oval), Adelaide
 West Australian Cricket Association (WACA Ground), Perth
 Tasmanian Cricket Association (Bellerive Oval), Hobart

Also other overseas grounds, including the Singapore and Hong Kong Cricket Clubs, the Cricket Club of India and the Marylebone Cricket Club (Lord's).

Cricket "Team of the Century"
On 1 December 1999, the MCC announced its cricket team of the century, with all players who had played at least one season for the club since 1906-07 being eligible for selection. The team as selected was:

Bill Ponsford
Colin McDonald
Dean Jones
Hunter Hendry
Paul Sheahan
Warwick Armstrong (Captain)
Hugh Trumble
Rob Templeton
Max Walker
Hans Ebeling
Bert Ironmonger
Vernon Ransford (12th Man)

All members of the team of the century except Robert Templeton had played at least one Test match for the Australian cricket team.

See also
 Melbourne Football Club
 Melbourne Baseball Club
 Melbourne Cricket Ground

References

External links
 Official website

Victorian Premier Cricket clubs
Cricket clubs in Melbourne
1838 establishments in Australia
Cricket clubs established in 1838
Multi-sport clubs in Australia
Sport in the City of Melbourne (LGA)